The 1993 Western Australian state election was held on 6 February 1993.

Retiring Members

Labor

Bob Pearce MLA (Armadale)
Gavan Troy MLA (Swan Hills)
Joe Berinson MLC (North Metropolitan)
Beryl Jones MLC (South West)
Fred McKenzie MLC (East Metropolitan)

Liberal

Bill Grayden MLA (South Perth)
Barry MacKinnon MLA (Jandakot)
Leon Watt MLA (Albany)
Diane Airey MLC (South Metropolitan)
Margaret McAleer MLC (Agricultural)
David Wordsworth MLC (Agricultural)

National

John Caldwell MLC (Agricultural)

Independent

Ian Alexander MLA (Perth) – elected as Labor
Frank Donovan MLA (Morley) – elected as Labor
Ian Thompson MLA (Darling Range) – elected as Liberal

Legislative Assembly
Sitting members are shown in bold text. Successful candidates are highlighted in the relevant colour. Where there is possible confusion, an asterisk (*) is also used.

Legislative Council

Sitting members are shown in bold text. Tickets that elected at least one MLC are highlighted in the relevant colour. Successful candidates are identified by an asterisk (*).

Agricultural
Five seats were up for election. The Labor Party was defending one seat. The Liberal Party was defending two seats. The National Party was defending two seats.

East Metropolitan
Five seats were up for election. The Labor Party was defending three seats. The Liberal Party was defending two seats.

Mining and Pastoral 
Five seats were up for election. The Labor Party was defending three seats. The Liberal Party was defending two seats.

North Metropolitan
Seven seats were up for election. The Labor Party was defending three seats. The Liberal Party was defending four seats.

South Metropolitan
Five seats were up for election. The Labor Party was defending three seats. The Liberal Party was defending two seats.

South West
Seven seats were up for election. The Labor Party was defending three seats. The Liberal Party was defending three seats. The National Party was defending one seat.

See also
 Members of the Western Australian Legislative Assembly, 1989–1993
 Members of the Western Australian Legislative Assembly, 1993–1996
 Members of the Western Australian Legislative Council, 1989–1993
 Members of the Western Australian Legislative Council, 1993–1997
 1993 Western Australian state election

References
 

Candidates for Western Australian state elections